Melamchi is a municipality in Sindhupalchok District in the Bagmati Province of central Nepal. At the time of the 1991 Nepal census it had a population of 3936 and had 710 houses in the village.

Government of Nepal has initiated a drinking water project called Melamchi water supply project to Kathmandu Valley.
 
The Melamchi Valley is typically narrow, steep Himalayan River-Valley. The lower valley slopes are very steep, rocky and "V" shaped in the High Mountain whereas in the Middle the valley slopes are dissected by rolling alluvial tars at the bottom. The middle mountain slopes, have gentler aspect and are the sites of settlements. The upper mountain slopes are very steep, rocky and with pointed ridgeline. On the contrary, upper hill slopes of middle part are also often rounded and smooth and are exploited for mountain agriculture and settlement. Elevation differences between the valley floor and surrounding ridges exceed over 1,000 m in the upper part.

People
The total population of the Melamchi Valley is 68,800 and the household size is 5.2 in average. Around 50.7 percent of the population is male and 49.3 percent of the population is female. About 40.5 percent of the population is under 14 years of age and 52 percent are under 60 years of age. Around 36 percent of the populations are Brahmin, Chhetri and Newar. Tamangs represent 38 percent and 6 percent are Kamis, Damais and Sarkis (KDS) and rest are others. Around 48.7 percent of the total population is economically active.

Culture
Hindu culture dominates the settlements of the valley areas while the Buddhist culture is prevalent in the high mountain settlements. Mid-hill settlements of the valley is the meeting ground of the two cultures. There are more than 11 Hindu temples and shrines, and about 14 monasteries in the Melamchi watershed.

Climate
The lower part of Melamchi valley has Sub-Tropical climate, while the upper part has Cool Temperate climate. Upper part Melamchi valley receives more rainfall than in the lower part. Heavy rainfall occurs in June, July and August. Rainfall in January and February is the lowest. The annual average rainfall in the Melamchi basin is about 2800 mm which is concentrated mostly during four months of the monsoon of mid-June to mid-September. Average annual rainfall conditions vary considerably by location in the valley. In general, average annual rainfall is low at lower elevation and is relatively high in the higher elevation. The average annual rainfall recorded for the period of 1991 to 1996 is 3,410 mm.

Institutions, NGOs and CBOs
There are various government programs conducted through DDCs and VDCs. There are about 38 NGOs and CBOs working the valley. They are working in the field of Health, Environment, Public awareness, Poverty Alleviation and Women development along with youth mobilization. Local Governance Program (LGP), sponsored by UNDP, and Action Aid Nepal (AAN) are working in the field of community development in the valley. Economy
 
The per capita income is Rs 6571. Melamchi Valley produces 17,883 metric tons of paddy, while requirement of food grain is lonely 11,027 metric tons per year. About 94 percent of the economically active populations are engaged in farm activities. Most of them are self-employed (over 80%). The major income activities in Melamchi area are services, pottering, business, tourism and remittances. Operation of water mills and fishing are also the major off-farm activities. Fishing is another source of income generating actively for the economically disadvantaged groups of the area. Disadvantaged group includes particularly Majhi, Danuwar, Tamang and Damai & Kami.

Tourism
Tourism sector is very significant to Melamchi area considering its diverse tradition and culture. The number of people directly benefited by tourism is not known. However, many people benefit directly or indirectly by tourism. Places like Helambu, Nakote, Melamchi Ghyang and Tarke Ghyang are most attractive places for tourism. According to Nepal Tourism Board, in average, 7,600 to 9,600 trekking permits are issued to the tourists who visit upstream areas of the Melamchi and to the Langtang National Park.

Health
Over 60 percent of households have access to safe water within 10 minutes’ travel time. Only 25 percent households have their own latrines. About 60 percent of the households have garbage pits to dispose household wastes. There is no water based sewer system in the Melamchi Valley. Stomach disorders (Diarrhea, Dysentery), and Respiratory problems (colds, coughs, Pneumonia, Asthma, Bronchitis, etc.) are the major diseases in Melamchi Valley. In addition, there are cases of TB, Leprosy, Malaria, STDs and some reported cases of HIV/AIDS in the valley. There are altogether 11 health centre within the Melamchi Valley. The nearest hospitals are located in Chautara, Sindhupalchok district and in Banepa (Kavrepalanchok district). An Ayurvedic dispensary is located at Melamchi Bazaar provides outdoor services through Ayurvedic physician. An ambulance has been provided by the MWSP for services in the valley. The service is provided by the Nepal Red Cross.

Environment
River system: The Melamchi River, a tributary of larger Indrawati River basin, originates from the high snowy mountain of the Jugal Himal at an elevation of 5875m. It joins with Indrawati River at Melamchi Pul Bazaar. The length of river is 41 km and the catchments area at the Melamchi Pul Bazaar, is 330 Km2. The river flows southwards and widens towards the downstream. The mean annual flow is 9.7 m3/s. The maximum flow is 289 m3/s. Melamchi River receives number of tributaries augmenting the discharge of Melamchi River. Of the 124,000 hectares of the catchments area of the Indrawati River basin, crop cultivation covers less than 2%, the rest is natural forest cover and rugged mountains. Water quality is not much of a problem in Melamchi and in its tributaries. The PH is little lower (7.3) in the upper part whereas it is 8.1 at the lower part of River. Low Calcium and Magnesium makes Melamchi water softer than the water of its tributaries. The level of turbidity is quite low. Temperature ranges from 6.5 to 9.5 0 C. Concentration of Sodium and Phosphorus are high at the lower part. The bacteria, E. Coli were moderately higher in upper part (7- 460/100ml) however, the cells are increasing in number in downstream.

Geology
Geologically Melamchi valley is dominated by metamorphic quartzite rocks with soils of colluvial nature. The major part of the, Melamchi valley is highly landslide prone and geologically fragile. Intensive agriculture, grazing and deforestation have played a significant role in accentuating the processes of erosion.

Biodiversity (flora, fauna, fish, and other aquatic life)
The natural vegetation of Melamchi Valley ranges from tropical zone to the Alpine pastures towards the north of Jugal Himal. The tropical zone (below 1000 m) is represented by Hill Sal Forest. Four forest types, viz. Chir Pine, Broadleaved Forest, Schima-Castonopsis and Castonopsis-Laurel . A total of 102 plant species have been found in the Melamchi Valley. Aquatic life in Melamchi River include 46 species of fish, 14 species of phytoplankton, six species of Zooplankton and 17 species of aquatic insects. Five species of fish are long distance migratory. Other eight are mid-range migratory fish and 33 species are local residents. Most of the tributaries are good places for breeding. Seven species of fishes available in Melamchi River are considered to be vulnerable.

Water use pattern
The water is being used in two forms in Melamchi Valley from Melamchi River: (i) Consumptive use for irrigation, and (ii) Non-consumptive use for water mills. Apart from these, uses for domestic supplies and the operation of micro-hydro power and paper mills have been recorded, However, only 15% of population of Melamchi valley uses water for drinking purposes directly from Melamchi River. However rest of population are using water either form tributaries or from nearby spring sources. Water is being diverted mostly for paddy field irrigation through the cascade practice. Most of the existing irrigation canals are open with temporary intake structure. At present, there are 32 irrigation canals existing, irrigating 289 ha of land at Melamchi valley. Water mills, micro-hydro and irrigation projects are utilizing water from Melamchi River. The total water requirement in Melamchi Valley is estimated to be 3.5 MLD and for irrigation requirements is 2140 L/ Sec (IUCN, 1999). Several Ghats are being used to cremate dead bodies along the Melamchi River bank (IUCN, 1999).

Land use
Land use in the Melamchi watershed is a combination of forest and agriculture. Forest accounts to about 27 percent of the total watershed area. Photo 11: An NGO working for public health and environmental aspects and a private medical center at Melamchi Market area

Langtang National Park
The upper part of Melamchi valley above the Helambu VDC is Langtang National Park. Langtang National Park (LNP) has an excellent condition of the habitat of the wildlife, which is protected. However, in the buffer zone, the habitats are degraded except some patches of forest in the river gorge that have maintained good habitat for wildlife.

Melamchi Water Supply Project (MWSP)

The objective of implementation of MSWP is to divert 170 MLD of water from Melamchi River through 25.83 km long tunnel, to the reservoir to be constructed at Mahankal, Sundarijal, where the water will be stored, and treated through the establishment of Water Treatment Plant. MWSP is located mostly in the Melamchi valley. The project's zone of impact in Melamchi Valley includes 14 VDCs out of 79 VDCs of Sindhupalchowk district. 11 VDCs are directly affected and 3 are taken as indirectly affected VDCs. It is predicted that the project will have significant effect on the environmental and socio-economic aspects of the Melamchi valley. Also the total length of the tunnel till 19 January 2017 in 223116 meters. Due to the political instability and internal conflicts inside the government parties (presently CPN(leninst-marxist) & CPN(maiost)) and bandas this project has been hugely affected.

Education and job training
About 57 percent of household head are literate. Over 18 percent has received some form of education without attending school, and around 12 percent have some primary level of education, over 15 percent have completed high school and over 11 percent have completed degree. There are 78 primary schools, 10 lower secondary schools, 9 secondary schools and 2 Higher Secondary Schools (10+2) are run by the government in the valley area. In addition, there are 6 boarding schools run by the private sector.

Technology
The Melamchi Project has CDMA phones now. Earlier they were using VSAT technology for telephony.

2015 Nepal earthquake
The village was affected by the earthquake on 25 April 2015. A joint coordination committee among all political parties in the three constituencies of the Sindhupalchok district was formed to carry out a rescue mission in the village.

Twin towns – sister cities 

 Kathmandu

References

Populated places in Sindhupalchowk District